Alfred M. Dickey (June 10, 1846 – January 26, 1901) was the first lieutenant governor of North Dakota, serving from 1889 to 1891 under Governor John Miller.  He was a prominent resident of Jamestown, North Dakota.

References

1901 deaths
1846 births
Lieutenant Governors of North Dakota
People from Jamestown, North Dakota
19th-century American politicians
Alfred M. Dickey was the first lieutenant governor of North Dakota.  He founded the Alfred Dickey Library in Jamestown, North Dakota, one hundred years ago.  The library has recently received a donation of personal correspondence and photographs from the descendants of Mr. Dickey.  Although this may not be encyclopædic material, future material shall be added.  Please bear with the descendants of Mr. Dickey.